Twitter is an online social networking and microblogging service that enables users to send and read "tweets", which are text messages limited to 280 characters. Registered users can read and post tweets but unregistered users can only read them. Users access Twitter through the website interface, SMS, or mobile device app. Twitter Inc. is based in San Francisco and has offices in New York City, Boston, Seattle, Boulder, and London.

Acquisitions

See also
 List of mergers and acquisitions by Alphabet
 List of mergers and acquisitions by Apple
 List of mergers and acquisitions by IBM
 List of mergers and acquisitions by Meta Platforms
 List of mergers and acquisitions by Microsoft
 List of mergers and acquisitions by Yahoo!
 Mergers and acquisitions

References

External links
 Twitter acquisitions

 List of acquisitions by Twitter
Twitter
Twitter
Twitter
Mergers